Beire is a Portuguese parish of the municipality of Paredes. The population in 2011 was 2,040, in an area of 3.31 km².

References

Freguesias of Paredes, Portugal